La Paz is a Caracas Metro station on Line 2. It was opened on 4 October 1987 as part of the inaugural section of Line 2 from La Paz to Las Adjuntas and Zoológico. The station served as the northern terminus of Line 2 until 6 November 1988, when the line was extended to El Silencio. The station is between Artigas and La Yaguara.

References

Caracas Metro stations
1987 establishments in Venezuela
Railway stations opened in 1987